John Patrick Crowley (born 23 June 1941 in Newbury, England) is a retired Roman Catholic bishop of Diocese of Middlesbrough, England, who carries the honorary title of Bishop Emeritus.

He was ordained a priest in 1965, and, as secretary to Cardinal Basil Hume, was appointed an auxiliary bishop, as titular Bishop of Tala, for the Archdiocese of Westminster, in 1986. In this post he had particular oversight of the diocese's parishes in Central London. On 3 November 1992 he became the 6th Bishop of Middlesbrough.

Crowley delivered the homily at the requiem for Cardinal Hume in Westminster Cathedral in June 1999.

In June 2001 Crowley agreed to celebrate Mass at a service of thanksgiving for a 25-year homosexual partnership between two Catholics, but withdrew at the last minute after a telephone call from Cardinal Cormac Murphy-O'Connor, who reportedly asked him not to attend. There was further controversy in 2005 when, during a radio interview, Crowley expressed the hope that married priests might be allowed in the Church within his lifetime.

His resignation from his post ten years before the customary date, which he said was due to the toll of pressures  of leadership in a particularly challenging era for the Church, was accepted by the Holy See in accordance with canon 401 para. 2 of the 1983 Code of Canon Law ("because of illness or some other grave reason") in May 2007.

 he was based in the parish of Our Lady of Lourdes, in Wanstead, London

References

External links
Catholic Hierarchy Website Entry
COMECE Entry (in German)

1941 births
Living people
Roman Catholic bishops of Middlesbrough
20th-century Roman Catholic bishops in England
21st-century Roman Catholic bishops in England